Robert George MacDonald (24 February 1885 – 29 March 1960) was a Scottish-American professional golfer and club maker who played in the early 20th century. He had three top-10 finishes in the U.S. Open. His best performance came in 1915 when he was third.  He finished eighth in 1916 and tenth in 1920. MacDonald was a frequent competitor in the PGA Championship, his best result coming in 1919 when he finished T3.

He won the 1922 Texas Open, pocketing $1,633 in prize money, and also won the Metropolitan Open twice, in 1921 and again in 1923. His career results could have been much better had it not been for the interruption caused by the First World War.

Early life
MacDonald was born on 24 February 1885 in Evelix, Scotland. As a young man he worked as a gardener and in 1900 served in the Second Boer War. He and his family emigrated to the United States in 1910 and his first posting as a professional was in New Jersey and he later took a job at Hyde Park Country Club in Cincinnati, Ohio.  MacDonald also had two brothers, Bill and Jack, who both went on to become professional golfers.

The Aberdeen Journal described MacDonald as "a big brawny Scotsman of the Braid type, and has all the markings of a first-class player". MacDonald took up a post at North Berwick with his brother-in-law, Donald MacKay, and James Watt. MacDonald would marry three times, the first to a French girl probably around 1908 when he was professional at Aix-les-Bains and playing in tournaments at Hyères and Costebelle on the French Riviera.

Golf career

1915 U.S. Open
The 1915 U.S. Open was the 21st U.S. Open, held 17–18 June at Baltusrol Golf Club in Springfield, New Jersey, west of New York City. Four-time U.S. Amateur champion Jerome Travers captured his only U.S. Open title, one stroke ahead of runner-up Tom McNamara. The championship was played on the original course at Baltusrol, now known as the Old Course, which no longer exists.

MacDonald played very well in the event.  He scored with rounds of 72-77-73-78=300 and finished in third place, winning $150 in prize money.

1919 PGA Championship
The 1919 PGA Championship was the second PGA Championship, contested from 16–20 September at the Engineers Country Club in Roslyn Harbor, New York. In his opening 36-hole match MacDonald slipped past Tom Boyd by the slim margin of 1 up. His play in the next match, against George Fotheringham, was more convincing when he was victorious 2 and 1.  He rode that momentum into his third match against a much better opponent, Jock Hutchison, but still managed to win 3 and 2. He found himself in the semi-finals against Jim Barnes and finally succumbed by the score of 5 and 4, finishing the tournament tied for third place.

Golf instructor
MacDonald was posted as professional at a number of clubs in the Chicago area, including Evanston, Edgewater, and Indian Hill Club.  He coached legendary golfers Gene Sarazen, Horton Smith and Babe Zaharias. His book, Golf, published in 1927, was a classic in the late 1920s.  In the book's preface he wrote, "It is probably beyond argument that the golf stroke, apart from the putt, is the most highly technical method of hitting a ball in the whole realm of sport".

He opened in 1918, with Jock Hutchison as partner, the first indoor golf facility in Chicago. The facility was later enlarged to cover 20,000 square feet by 1926.

Death and legacy
MacDonald died in West Hollywood, Florida, on 29 March 1960 after an illness lasting several months. He is best remembered for having three top-10 finishes in the U.S. Open, including a third-place finish in 1915, and for winning three PGA Tour events. He finished T3 in the 1919 PGA Championship and at age 49 finished T54 in the 1935 Masters Tournament.

PGA Tour wins (3)
1921 Metropolitan Open
1922 Texas Open
1923 Metropolitan Open

Results in major championships

Note: MacDonald never played in The Open Championship.

NYF = Tournament not yet founded
NT = No tournament
DNP = Did not play
? = Unknown

R64, R32, R16, QF, SF = Round in which player lost in PGA Championship match play
"T" indicates a tie for a place
Yellow background for top-10.

References

Scottish male golfers
PGA Tour golfers
Scottish emigrants to the United States
1885 births
1960 deaths